The Women's team time trial of the 2017 UCI Road World Championships was a cycling event that took place on 17 September 2017 in Bergen, Norway. Nine teams and a total of fifty-four riders contested the event, the opening race of the Road World Championships.

The five remaining riders won their first world title, in a result described as an "upset", as it was the squad's first team time trial win of 2017.

Final classification
All nine teams completed the -long course.

References

External links
Team time trial page at Bergen 2017 website

Women's team time trial
UCI Road World Championships – Women's team time trial
2017 in women's road cycling